The Albacora class was a diesel-electric attack submarine (SSK) developed for the Portuguese Navy based on the French .

In 1964, the Portuguese government ordered the construction of four of this class at the Dubigeòn-Normándie Shipyard to create the 4th Submarine Flotilla.

With the first submarine commissioned on 1 October 1967, the Portuguese Navy started to have a submarine able to operate in both coastal and oceanic zones, especially in the Portuguese exclusive economic zone.

The last Albacora-class submarine in service, NRP Barracuda, made its final mission in 2010. The class was replaced by two Type 209PN/Type 214PN submarines.

Ships

External links 

 Área Militar: Albacora class submarine (in Portuguese)
 NRP Barracuda profile at the Portuguese Navy website (in Portuguese)

Submarine classes